Eve Elisabeth Matheson (born March 1960) is an English actress. She is best known for her roles as Zoe Angell in May to December and Becky Sharp in the BBC adaptation of the novel Vanity Fair.
Matheson left May to December after two series to pursue her career on stage. From 2005 to 2006, she appeared as Mrs Milcote in the original Royal National Theatre production of Helen Edmundson's Coram Boy.

Personal life
Eve Matheson is married to the actor Phil Davis and they have one daughter, born 2002.

Filmography

Film

Television

References

External links

British television actresses
Living people
1960 births
People from Hammersmith
Actresses from London
20th-century British actresses
21st-century British actresses
20th-century English women
20th-century English people
21st-century English women
21st-century English people